Mahmoud Abdelaal (born 1 January 1992) is an Egyptian boxer. He competed in the men's lightweight event at the 2016 Summer Olympics.

References

External links
 
 
 
 

1992 births
Living people
Egyptian male boxers
Olympic boxers of Egypt
Boxers at the 2016 Summer Olympics
Lightweight boxers
21st-century Egyptian people